Maesyprior is a Site of Special Scientific Interest in Carmarthen & Dinefwr,  Wales.  A system of glacial meltwater channels preserved at this site contains important geological evidence concerning the nature of late Pleistocene geomorphological processes in west Wales.

See also
List of Sites of Special Scientific Interest in Carmarthen & Dinefwr

References

Sites of Special Scientific Interest in Carmarthen & Dinefwr